King Christian Island is an uninhabited member of the Arctic Archipelago in the Sverdrup Islands, a part of the Queen Elizabeth Islands archipelago, in the Qikiqtaaluk Region of Nunavut, Canada. It lies in the Arctic Ocean,  from the southwestern coast of Ellef Ringnes Island, separated by the Danish Strait.

The first European to visit the island was Gunnar Isachsen in 1901. Vilhjalmur Stefansson charted its southern coast in 1916.

References

External links
 King Christian Island in the Atlas of Canada - Toporama; Natural Resources Canada

Further reading

 Balkwill, H. R., and Roy, K. J.; Geology of King Christian Island, District of Franklin. Ottawa: Minister of Supply and Services Canada, 1977. 

Islands of the Queen Elizabeth Islands
Sverdrup Islands
Uninhabited islands of Qikiqtaaluk Region